MPR may refer to:

Medicine 
 The MMR vaccine, from Latin morbilli (measles), parotitis (mumps) and rubella
 Mannose 6-phosphate receptor, a family of transmembrane proteins that help transport proteins from the Golgi apparatus
Median price ratio, for drug costs
 Membrane progesterone receptor, a group of cell surface receptors for progesterone
 Multi-planar reformatting, or multiplanar reconstruction, a medical imaging technique – see CT scan#Multiplanar_reconstruction
Monthly Prescribing Reference, an online drug reference for healthcare professionals

Organizations 

 A local abbreviation for Popular Movement of the Revolution, a political party in the Democratic Republic of the Congo
 Chadian People's Revolutionary Movement, a Chadian rebel group that operated in the 1980s
Minnesota Public Radio
 Missouri Pacific Railroad
 Mongolian People's Republic
People's Consultative Assembly, Majelis Permusyawaratan Rakyat, the Indonesian body comprising both legislative houses
 Swedish National Board for Measurement and Testing, later changed to Swedish Board for Accreditation and Conformity Assessment (SWEDAC)
Russian Naval Infantry, (Morskaya Pekhota Rossii), the amphibious warfare branch of the Russian Navy

Other uses 

Matched precipitation rate, an irrigation term when all sprinkler heads in a zone apply water equally
Magnetic proton recoil neutron spectrometer
Meter point reference
Microparticle performance rating, used to measure an air filter's ability to capture small particles (< 1 micrometre)
Minkowski Portal Refinement, a computer algorithm for detecting collision (overlap) between convex shapes
Montpelier (Amtrak station), Amtrak code for a station in Vermont, United States
MPR Hopf algebra in mathematics
Multipacket Reception, a term in wireless receiver technology.
Multipoint relay in Computer Networks
 Multi-Purpose Room (Gym)
My Pokémon Ranch, a video game
 Moisture to Protein Ratio, commonly used in the production of Salami
Mid-Pleistocene Revolution, a climax change involving glacial periodicity in quaternary geology, around 900,000 years ago.